David Lawrence Davidson (born April 23, 1984) is a Canadian former professional baseball pitcher. He played in Major League Baseball (MLB) for the Pittsburgh Pirates and Florida Marlins.

Career
Davidson was drafted by the Pirates in the 10th round of the 2002 Major League Baseball draft. On September 3, 2007, the Pirates called him up. He made his debut on September 6 and gave up 3 earned runs in 1 inning.

Davidson played in the 2008 Summer Olympics, as a member of Canada's national team.  He played for Canada in the 2009 World Baseball Classic.

Davidson was claimed off waivers by the Florida Marlins on April 24, 2009. He was called up on May 21, and designated for assignment two days later. On May 28, Davidson was claimed off waivers by the Baltimore Orioles and immediately optioned to Triple-A Norfolk. However, a shoulder injury was discovered, voiding the waiver claim, and he was sent back to Florida. On October 9, 2009, Davidson was released by the Marlins. He last played in 2011 with the Edmonton Capitals of the North American League.

References

External links

1984 births
Living people
Altoona Curve players
Baseball people from Ontario
Baseball players at the 2008 Summer Olympics
Canadian expatriate baseball players in the United States
Edmonton Capitals players
Florida Marlins players
Gulf Coast Pirates players
Hickory Crawdads players
Indianapolis Indians players
Lynchburg Hillcats players
Major League Baseball pitchers
Major League Baseball players from Canada
Olympic baseball players of Canada
Pittsburgh Pirates players
Sportspeople from Richmond Hill, Ontario
Williamsport Crosscutters players
World Baseball Classic players of Canada
2009 World Baseball Classic players
Tomateros de Culiacán players
Canadian expatriate baseball players in Mexico
Grand Canyon Rafters players
New Orleans Zephyrs players
Phoenix Desert Dogs players